Sir John Edmund de Beauvoir, 2nd Baronet (10 December 1794 – 29 April 1869), known as John Edmund Browne until 14 October 1826, was a British Radical politician.

He was the son of Sir John Edmond Browne, 1st Baronet and Margaret Lorinan. Between 1825 and 1826, he married Mary Wright, daughter of Richard Wright, but after he death in 1831, he remarried to Laetitia Mann, daughter of Reverend Charles Mann and Susanna MacDougal on 16 March 1867. He was appointed a Knight on 9 March 1827, and succeeded as 2nd Baronet Browne of Palmerstown on 5 September 1835, upon his father's death.

De Beauvoir was elected Radical Member of Parliament for Windsor at the 1835 general election but was unseated four months later. While he attempted to regain the seat at the 1837 and 1841 general elections, he was unsuccessful.

He was also an officer in the 26th (Cameronian) Regiment of Foot.

References

External links
 

UK MPs 1835–1837
Baronets in the Baronetage of Great Britain
Members of the Parliament of the United Kingdom for English constituencies
1794 births
1869 deaths
Cameronians officers